The UK Singles Chart is one of many music charts compiled by the Official Charts Company that calculates the best-selling singles of the week in the United Kingdom. Before 2004, the chart was only based on the sales of physical singles. This list shows singles that peaked in the Top 10 of the UK Singles Chart during 1964, as well as singles which peaked in 1963 and 1965 but were in the top 10 in 1964. The entry date is when the single appeared in the top 10 for the first time (week ending, as published by the Official Charts Company, which is six days after the chart is announced).

One-hundred and twelve singles were in the top ten in 1964. Ten singles from 1963 remained in the top 10 for several weeks at the beginning of the year, while "I Could Easily Fall (In Love With You)" by Cliff Richard and The Shadows, and "Somewhere" by P. J. Proby were both released in 1964 but did not reach their peak until 1965. "Dominique" by The Singing Nun, "Glad All Over" by The Dave Clark Five, "I Only Want to Be with You" by Dusty Springfield and "Twenty Four Hours From Tulsa" by Gene Pitney were the singles from 1963 to reach their peak in 1964. Twenty-eight artists scored multiple entries in the top 10 in 1964. The Beach Boys, Cilla Black, The Hollies, The Kinks and The Rolling Stones were among the many artists who achieved their first UK charting top 10 single in 1964.

The 1963 Christmas number-one, "I Want To Hold Your Hand" by The Beatles, remained at number one for the first two weeks of 1964. The first new number-one single of the year was "Glad All Over" by The Dave Clark Five. Overall, twenty-three different singles peaked at number-one in 1964, with The Beatles (3) having the most singles hit that position.

Background

Multiple entries
One-hundred and twelve singles charted in the top 10 in 1964, with one-hundred and four singles reaching their peak this year.

Twenty-eight artists scored multiple entries in the top 10 in 1964. Cliff Richard secured the record for most top 10 hits in 1964 with six hit singles, five of which featured his backing group The Shadows.

The Animals were one of a number of artists with two top-ten entries, including the number-one single "The House of the Rising Sun". Brian Poole, Freddie and the Dreamers, The Kinks, Manfred Mann and The Supremes were among the other artists who had multiple top 10 entries in 1964.

Chart debuts
Thirty-eight artists achieved their first top 10 single in 1964, either as a lead or featured artist. Of these, six went on to record another hit single that year: The Animals, The Kinks, The Nashville Teens, Peter and Gordon, The Supremes and The Swinging Blue Jeans. Cilla Black, Manfred Mann, P. J. Proby and The Rolling Stones all had two more top 10 singles in 1964. The Hollies had three other entries in their breakthrough year.

The following table (collapsed on desktop site) does not include acts who had previously charted as part of a group and secured their first top 10 solo single.

Songs from films
Original songs from various films entered the top 10 throughout the year. These included "Kissin' Cousins" (from Kissin' Cousins) and "A Hard Day's Night", "Move Over Darling" (Move Over, Darling) and "A Hard Day's Night" and "Can't Buy Me Love" (A Hard Day's Night).

Additionally, the original recording of "Swinging on a Star" by Bing Crosby won the Academy Award for Best Original Song after being used in the 1944 film Going My Way. "Diane" was written for the 1927 silent film Seventh Heaven. P. J. Proby released a cover version of "Somewhere" from the film West Side Story, reaching number six at the beginning of 1965.

Best-selling singles
Until 1970 there was no universally recognised year-end best-sellers list. However in 2011 the Official Charts Company released a list of the best-selling single of each year in chart history from 1952 to date. According to the list, "Can't Buy Me Love" by The Beatles is officially recorded as the biggest-selling single of 1964. "Can't Buy Me Love" (4) and "I Feel Fine" (5) both ranked in the top 10 best-selling singles of the decade.

Top-ten singles
Key

Entries by artist

The following table shows artists who achieved two or more top 10 entries in 1964, including singles that reached their peak in 1963 or 1965. The figures include both main artists and featured artists. The total number of weeks an artist spent in the top ten in 1964 is also shown.

See also
1964 in British music
List of number-one singles from the 1960s (UK)

Notes

 "Somewhere" reached its peak of number six on 20 January 1965 (week ending).
 "Swinging on a Star" features uncredited guest vocals by Little Eva.
 "Stay" re-entered the top 10 at number 8 on 5 February 1964 (week ending).
 "Walk On By" re-entered the top 10 at number 10 on 10 June 1964 (week ending).
 Figure includes single that peaked in 1963.
 Figure includes single that peaked in 1965.
 Figure includes single that first charted in 1963 but peaked in 1964.

References
General

Specific

External links
1964 singles chart archive at the Official Charts Company (click on relevant week)

Top 10 singles
United Kingdom
1964